Litenčice is a market town in Kroměříž District in the Zlín Region of the Czech Republic. It has about 500 inhabitants.

Administrative parts
The village of Strabenice is an administrative part of Litenčice.

Geography
It lies in the Litenčice Hills.

History

Archaeological findings of an early medieval burial site denote a settlement already during the Great Moravian empire. The first written mention of Litenčice is from 1141 in a deed issued by bishop Jindřich Zdík in a rental of the Spytihněv archdeaconry.

A fortress existed here from the second half of the 14th century, however, it was first mentioned in 1437, when it was held by the Zástřizl family. In 1667, during the rule of archbishop Péter Pázmány, it was largely rebuilt to a Baroque palace.

Sights
The main sight is the Litenčice Castle. Today it is privately owned and inaccessible.

References

External links

Populated places in Kroměříž District
Market towns in the Czech Republic